The women's 200 metres event at the 1996 World Junior Championships in Athletics was held in Sydney, Australia, at International Athletic Centre on 23 and 24 August.

Medalists

Results

Final
24 August
Wind: -2.2 m/s

Semifinals
24 August

Semifinal 1

Semifinal 2

Quarterfinals
23 August

Quarterfinal 1
Wind: -0.7 m/s

Quarterfinal 2
Wind: -0.3 m/s

Quarterfinal 3
Wind: -1.2 m/s

Quarterfinal 4
Wind: -3.1 m/s

Heats
23 August

Heat 1
Wind: 0.0 m/s

Heat 2
Wind: -0.3 m/s

Heat 3
Wind: -0.1 m/s

Heat 4

Heat 5

Heat 6
Wind: -1.1 m/s

Participation
According to an unofficial count, 43 athletes from 32 countries participated in the event.

References

200 metres
200 metres at the World Athletics U20 Championships